The Research Organization for Life Sciences and Environment (ORIPHL) is one of Research Organizations under the umbrella of the National Research and Innovation Agency (BRIN). It was founded on 1 September 2021 as the Research Organization for Life Sciences (ORIPH) transformation of Deputy II (Life Sciences) of Indonesian Institute of Sciences (LIPI) after the liquidation of LIPI into BRIN.

On 24 January 2022, it is announced that the organization extended with fusion of the ORIPH with FORDA-MOF of Ministry of Environment and Forestry, resulted in formation of ORIPHL. The fusion expected to turn ORIPH to ORIPHL officially on 1 February 2022. ORIPKM formation is finalized on 1 March 2022 and is functional since 4 March 2022.

History 
Founded on 1 September 2021 as ORIPH, ORIPH was transformation of Deputy II (Life Sciences) of LIPI after the liquidation of LIPI into BRIN. As research organizations of BRIN, as outlined in Article 175 and Article 176 of Chief of BRIN Decree No. 1/2021, every Research Organizations under BRIN are responsible and answered to Chief of BRIN. It also prescribed that the Research Organizations consisted with Head of Research Organizations, Centers, and Laboratories/Study Groups. For the transitional period, as in Article 210 of Chief of BRIN Decree No. 1/2021 mandated, the structure of ORIPH follows the preceding structure that already established during its time in LIPI. Due to this, the structure of ORIPH largely follows the Chief of LIPI Decree No. 24/2020. In addition of the preexisting research centers, ORIPH also housed the Eijkman Institute for Molecular Biology after BRIN acquired it on 22 September 2021. The name of Eijkman Institute later changed to Eijkman Molecular Biology Research Center, under the Life Sciences Research Organization of National Research and Innovation Agency. On 22 September 2021, ORIPH constituting document, Chief of BRIN Decree No. 8/2021, signed by Laksana Tri Handoko and fully published on 8 October 2021.

As ORIPH, the organization was briefly served as temporary house of Eijkman Molecular Biology Research Center. After controversy over Eijkman demotion and split, Eijkman later restructured by BRIN but they reorganized and transferred to Health Research Organization, no longer under ORIPH anymore.

On 24 January 2022, it is announced that the organization extended with fusion of the former FORDA-MOF. The fusion will turn ORIPH to ORIPHL officially on 1 February 2022. The reorganization also transferred Eijkman Molecular Biology Research Center to Health Research Organization.

On 4 March 2022, ORIPHL is fully functional with inauguration of its first head, Iman Hidayat.

Structure 
The structure of ORIPHL is as follows:

 Office of the Head of ORIPHL
 Research Center for Genetic Engineering 
 Research Center for Biosystematics and Evolution
 Research Center for Ecology and Ethnobiology
 Research Center for Applied Microbiology
 Research Center for Applied Zoology
 Research Center for Biotechnology
 Research Center for Biomass and Bioproducts
 Research Center for Environmental and Clean Technology
 Research Center for Plant Conservation, Botanical Gardens, and Forestry
 Research Groups

List of Heads

References 

 
Science and technology in Indonesia
National Research and Innovation Agency
2021 establishments in Indonesia